Butyrophilin subfamily 3 member A3 is a protein that in humans is encoded by the BTN3A3 gene.

References

Further reading

External links